Netarhat is a hill station in Latehar district in the Indian state of Jharkhand. It is also referred to as the "Queen of Chotanagpur", and is a hill station. 
The town is also famous for Netarhat Residential School, set up in 1954.

Geography

It is a plateau covered with thick forest. It consists of crystalline rocks and has a summit capped with sandstone trap or laterite. Region of Netarhat is covered with Sal, Kendu, Mahua and Eucalyptus. The highest point is

Transport

Tourism
Netarhat is known for its sunrises and sunsets during the summer months. It is located within forests which have varied flora and fauna.

Netarhat has several places of tourist interests:
Upper Ghaghri Falls is situated 4 km away from Netarhat. 
Lodh Falls is the highest waterfall of Jharkhand and 21st highest in India. This waterfall is situated at 70 km away from Netarhat and in the forest of Sal.
Mahuadanr Wolf Sanctuary is the lone sanctuary in India made for the protection of wolves and mainly consists of Indian wolves.
Magnolia Point, It is 10 km away from Netarhat and is known for its sunset.
Sunrise Point is situated in Netarhat and known for its sunrise at mornings.
Lower Ghaghri Falls It is situated 10 km away from Netarhat and is known for its waterfall.
Koel river View Point is 3 km from Netarhat.
Suga Bandh Falls is situated at 70 km away from Netarhat and is a picnic spot for locals.
Sadni Falls is 35 km from Netarhat.
Betla National Park is situated at 94 km away from the place and known among the first national parks in India to become a tiger reserve under Project Tiger (Palamu Tiger Reserve), 64 km away from Netarhat. It also houses two historic forts of Chero kings.
Netarhat Residential School, boarding school and one of the few modern 'Gurukuls' left in India.
Pear Orchards and Pine Forests are initiative of local Forest Department and they planted a lot of trees in the place.

Education
Netarhat Vidyalaya is a residential public school set up in 1954. It sits on over 780 acres.

Jungle Warfare School 

There is another academy of police training college located in Jharkhand police named as Jungle Warfare School, or JWFS in short. It has a big campus spreading over 192 acres near Upper Ghagri waterfall and was established in 2008 to train state police especially on the lines of Armed Forces to fight and counter growing Naxal insurgency in the state. It also holds a CIAT I.e Counter Insurgency and Anti Terrorist training school. Short term courses are taken by state forces to excel in jungle warfare tactics and counter-insurgency and naxalism. Later the school was upgraded to train police recruit constables and also to train promotee upgraded refreshment courses for Head constables. The size of batch is almost 890.

There is one more school the ST Xavier's Boarding school in hill station.

References

Latehar district
Community development blocks in Jharkhand
Cities and towns in Latehar district
Hill stations in Jharkhand